Irving is an American indie rock band. It was founded by Alex Church, later of Sea Wolf, Brian Canning and Steven Scott in 1998, after playing together for the first time at an arts festival. Soon after, they added keyboardist Shana Levy and Brent Turner; Levy remained with the group until 2003, when Aaron Burrows joined. Rather than having a frontman, the vocal and songwriting aspects are shared by at least three people. They acquired modest popularity  after airplay on MTV2 for the song "Situation" in spring 2006.  Members Aaron Burrows, Brian Canning, Steven Scott and Brent Turner formed the band Afternoons along with, Grammy Award winning producer Tom Biller, and multi-instrumentalist Sam Johnson.

Members
Current
Steven Scott
Alex Church
Brian Canning
Brent Turner, drums
Aaron Burrows, keyboards

Former
Shana Levy, keyboards

Discography 

Irving (limited edition 7") (2001)
Good Morning Beautiful (Eenie Meenie Records, 2002)
I Hope You're Feeling Better Now (EP) (Eenie Meenie, 2003)
Death in the Garden, Blood on the Flowers (Eenie Meenie, 2006)
Spaceland Presents (live) (Graceland Records, 2007)

References

External links
Irving live on WOXY.com, April 5, 2006

Indie rock musical groups from California
Musical groups from Los Angeles